Caloptilia hilaropis is a moth of the family Gracillariidae. It is known from the Austral Islands, the southernmost group of islands in French Polynesia.

References

hilaropis
Moths of Oceania
Moths described in 1926